Thelonious Monk Plays Duke Ellington is an album by jazz pianist Thelonious Monk that was released by Riverside in 1955. It was also released under the title Thelonious Monk Plays the Music of Duke Ellington. The album contains Monk's versions of songs by Duke Ellington. The album was reissued by Riverside on March 27, 2007, in the United States and on April 16, 2007, in the United Kingdom.

Background 
Although Monk occasionally performed covers, he primarily played his own compositions. He had recorded several albums of originals during 1953-54 for his previous label, Prestige. But there was a perception, particularly among music critics, that Monk's music was "too difficult"  for the mainstream public, and his Prestige albums sold poorly. After Riverside bought out Monk's contract in 1954 for slightly over $100, Riverside convinced Monk to record an entire album of Ellington tunes, an idea of record producer Orrin Keepnews.

Monk's only 1955 session including his original compositions took place on October 15, and was released under the group name Gigi Gryce Quartet, occupying Side 2 of the album Nica's Tempo.  As the next Riverside album, The Unique Thelonious Monk consisted of standards, it would be another year before Riverside Records recorded any original Monk compositions (for the album Brilliant Corners)

Reception 
Sean Murphy of PopMatters called it "an outstanding album" when it was reissued in 2007. He called it an "overlooked gem in the Monk discography, sandwiched as it is between his earlier 'genius of modern music' stage and the mid '50s through mid '60s, when he made his most enduring work." Allmusic's Lindsay Planer gave the album four out of five stars and felt that Ellington's characteristic "delicacy and inherently intricate melodies" are ideal for "Monk's angular and progressive interpretations." He recommended it to "all dimension of jazz enthusiast", even though "Monk and Ellington aficionados may rate it slightly higher."

By contrast, David Rickert of All About Jazz found the album "fairly tame" and lagging with "an ambling pace". Although he viewed it as "a worthy addition to any serious Monk collection", Rickert wrote that it lacked Monk's more "abrasive" sound and "obscures what makes Monk so captivating in the first place."

Jazz pianist Marcus Roberts called the album "a masterpiece in jazz" and cited it as a template for his 1990 album Alone with Three Giants. "When you think of great artists paying homage to great artists, that one recording let me know what I had to do."

Track listing
All songs written by Duke Ellington except where noted

Side One
 It Don't Mean a Thing (If It Ain't Got That Swing) - 4:38
 Sophisticated Lady - 4:27
 I Got It Bad and That Ain't Good - 5:52
 Black and Tan Fantasy (Miley, Ellington) - 3:24

Side Two
 Mood Indigo (Ellington, Bigard) - 3:13
 I Let a Song Go Out of My Heart - 5:40
 Solitude - 3:42
 Caravan (Tizol, Ellington) - 5:55

Personnel
Thelonious Monk – piano
Oscar Pettiford – bass
Kenny Clarke – drums

References 

1955 albums
Thelonious Monk albums
Riverside Records albums
Albums produced by Orrin Keepnews
Albums recorded at Van Gelder Studio